Anaerorhabdus is a Gram-negative, anaerobic, non-spore-forming and non-motile genus of bacteria from the family of Erysipelotrichaceae.

See also
 List of bacterial orders
 List of bacteria genera

References

Erysipelotrichia
Bacteria genera
Taxa described in 1986